The Basilica of Saint Mary in the Old Town Old and Historic District, of Alexandria, Virginia, (United States) and is a minor basilica and parish church of the Roman Catholic Diocese of Arlington in Virginia. The Basilica of Saint Mary is the oldest Roman Catholic church in the Commonwealth of Virginia. It was founded in 1795 by the Very Reverend Francis Ignatius Neale, then the president of Georgetown University (then known as Georgetown College), in present-day western Washington, D.C.

On December 6, 2017, Pope Francis designated the parish church as a minor basilica. The decision was announced on January 15, 2018, and the basilica held its inauguration Mass on September 8, 2018.

First church 
On March 17, 1788, George Washington's former Aide-de-Camp Lt. Colonel John Fitzgerald hosted a dinner for prominent Maryland and Virginia citizens at his home in Alexandria, hoping to raise building funds for the first permanent Catholic parish in the Commonwealth. It is asserted by the church that verified documentation from the period exists to prove that General George Washington himself made a contribution to the fund, an amount equivalent to approximately $1,200 today. Two individuals agreed to donate a portion of the land at Church and South Washington Streets, then just outside the Alexandria city limits, to the church. They were Thornton Alexander, heir to the founder of the City of Alexandria John Alexander and Colonel Robert T. Hooe, one of Adams' "midnight appointments" made during the final days of his administration that led to Marbury v. Madison.

The first brick structure, built at Church and South Washington Streets, was known as the Church of Saint Mary. The chapel's cornerstone was laid in 1795, and work continued in 1796, according to letters from Archbishop John Carroll, S.J. of Baltimore.

At the church, there is a plaque which states:In grateful acknowledgement of their aid in establishing this church the three trees to the north of this stone have been dedicated as follows to General George Washington as subscriber to the building, Colonel John Fitzgerald, his favorite aide de camp, as the collector of the building fund, Colonel Robert Hooe, mayer of Alexandria, as the donor of the acre of land.

Second church 
In 1810, a parcel of land closer to the center of Alexandria was purchased for the new church. By 1827, Reverend Father Joseph W. Fairclough, Pastor, erected the Sanctuary and the major portion of the present church at its current location – 310 South Royal Street.

Cemetery 
In the 1830s, the original chapel was demolished, its bricks used to build the Alexandria Lyceum. The land where the original chapel stood became home to the St. Mary Cemetery, the first Catholic cemetery in the Commonwealth of Virginia. St. Mary School would later also be added to the location.

Several Revolutionary War soldiers are known to be buried in the cemetery. Unfortunately, the early records of burial plots are missing. Alexandria historian Michael Miller in his book “Burials in St. Mary’s Catholic Cemetery 1799-1983” identified the first known burial at the new cemetery as Caven Boa who died August 20, 1799. He was a member of the Corps of Artillery and was buried by full military honors. His grave site is among those unknown. Virginia historian Wesley E. Pippenger in his “Tombstone Inscriptions of Alexandria” identified known revolutionary soldiers buried at St. Mary's that including Private Lawrence Hurdle who died in 1848 at the age of 98. Two other identified were Francis Ignatius Hagen who died in 1830 at age 76, and Pierre La Croix who died in 1830 at the age 88. La Croix served in the French and Indian War under Gen. Montcalm and later in the Revolutionary War under Gen. Montgomery.

The cemetery also includes the graves of many other soldiers from other wars, including more than 40 soldiers from the Civil War.

See also

References

External links

Official Parish Site
Roman Catholic Diocese of Arlington Official Site

Churches in Alexandria, Virginia
Churches in the Roman Catholic Diocese of Arlington
Roman Catholic churches completed in 1810
Religious organizations established in 1795
1795 establishments in the United States
Basilica churches in the United States
19th-century Roman Catholic church buildings in the United States
Minor basilicas in the United States